Pros & Cons is a comic strip about a lawyer, a psychiatrist and a police officer created by Glasgow–based artist Kieran Meehan. It was known as A Lawyer, A Doctor & A Cop before July 7, 2008, when it was renamed in an effort to make the title easier to remember.

Characters

Lyndon Peel is a sophisticated psychiatrist who is happily oblivious to his own issues.

Samuel Rhodes is a skeptical defense attorney. He is married to Michele. They have an opinionated seven-year-old named Jack, who is based on Meehan's younger brother, David, and nephew, Michael.

Stan Defoe, a tough-talking detective, is dedicated and street-wise.

Sophie Defoe, Stan's sister, is the sagacious proprietor of 'Defoe's Diner'

Gillian Jaggers, a brilliant District Attorney, is a ruthless opponent to Samuel in the courtroom.  She and Stan dated for a while.

Recurring themes
 Lyndon, Samuel and Stan, a trio of friends, are often seen eating at Defoe's Diner.
 The trio are also often seen trying to figure out a painting's meaning in an art gallery.
 Each of the characters are frequently shown solo, working in their respective professions.

External links
 Official Site
 Page on King Features site

References

British comic strips
2005 comics debuts
2008 comics endings
Gag-a-day comics